The 1960 Holy Cross Crusaders football team was an American football team that represented the College of the Holy Cross as an independent during the 1960 NCAA University Division football season. Eddie Anderson returned for the 11th consecutive year as head coach, his 17th year overall. For the second year in a row, the team compiled a record of 6–4. All home games were played at Fitton Field on the Holy Cross campus in Worcester, Massachusetts.

Schedule

Statistical leaders
Statistical leaders for the 1960 Crusaders included: 
 Rushing: Tom Hennessey, 365 yards and 3 touchdowns on 73 attempts
 Passing: Pat McCarthy, 941 yards, 59 completions and 4 touchdowns on 142 attempts
 Receiving: Richard Skinner, 158 yards on 16 receptions
 Scoring: Pat McCarthy, 42 points on 5 touchdowns and 2 two-point conversions
 Total offense: Pat McCarthy, 1,220 yards (941 passing, 279 rushing)
 All-purpose yards: Tom Hennessey, 1,066 yards (418 returning, 365 rushing, 283 receiving)

References

Holy Cross
Holy Cross Crusaders football seasons
Holy Cross Crusaders football